Winterport is a town in Waldo County, Maine, United States. The population was 3,817 at the 2020 census. The Winterport Historic District, extending several blocks along Main Street (United States Route 1A), was listed on the National Register of Historic Places in 1975.

History

First settled in 1766 as part of Frankfort, it was set off and incorporated on March 12, 1860. It was named Winterport because of its fine harbor on the Penobscot River estuary, which generally remained ice free, and so became a busy local terminus for trade and shipping during winter months. When the upper Penobscot River froze, commodities like flour were hauled in large quantities from here to Bangor.

In 1841, Theophilus Cushing opened a large steam mill which manufactured 11,000,000 feet of lumber annually. It also made sugar box shooks, lath, clapboard, and soap and candle boxes. The town had two cooperage factories. Other industries produced harnesses, cheese and butter, and men's vests. Until the Panic of 1857, Winterport was a shipbuilding center. But the principal business for most of the town was agriculture.

Geography

Drained by the Marsh River, Winterport is bounded by the Penobscot River.

The town is crossed by U.S. Route 1A, as well as Maine State Route 69 and Maine State Route 139. It borders the towns of Frankfort to the south, Monroe to the west, and Hampden and Newburgh to the north. Bucksport lies across the Penobscot River to the east which prior to the opening of the Waldo-Hancock Bridge in 1931 was reached from Winterport by way of the Winterport Ferry Co.

Demographics

2010 census

As of the census of 2010, there were 3,757 people, 1,503 households, and 1,100 families living in the town. The racial makeup of the town was 97.0% White, 0.3% African American, 0.6% Native American, 0.7% Asian, 0.1% Pacific Islander, 0.2% from other races, and 1.1% from two or more races. Hispanic or Latino of any race were 0.8% of the population.

There were 1,503 households, of which 32.8% had children under the age of 18 living with them, 58.7% were married couples living together, 10.4% had a female householder with no husband present, 4.1% had a male householder with no wife present, and 26.8% were non-families. 20.0% of all households were made up of individuals, and 6.5% had someone living alone who was 65 years of age or older. The average household size was 2.50 and the average family size was 2.84.

The median age in the town was 41.5 years. 22.9% of residents were under the age of 18; 6.6% were between the ages of 18 and 24; 25.1% were from 25 to 44; 34.2% were from 45 to 64; and 11.2% were 65 years of age or older. The gender makeup of the town was 49.4% male and 50.6% female.

2000 census

As of the census of 2000, there were 3,602 people, 1,379 households, and 1,035 families living in the town. The racial makeup of the town was 98.11% White, 0.19% Black or African American, 0.50% Native American, 0.22% Asian, 0.06% Pacific Islander, 0.11% from other races, and 0.81% from two or more races. Hispanic or Latino of any race were 0.39% of the population.

There were 1,379 households, out of which 36.0% had children under the age of 18 living with them, 62.1% were married couples living together, 9.4% had a female householder with no husband present, and 24.9% were non-families. 18.7% of all households were made up of individuals, and 6.2% had someone living alone who was 65 years of age or older.  The average household size was 2.60 and the average family size was 2.96.

In the town, the population was spread out, with 26.3% under the age of 18, 7.9% from 18 to 24, 30.4% from 25 to 44, 25.5% from 45 to 64, and 9.8% who were 65 years of age or older.  The median age was 37 years. For every 100 females, there were 98.0 males.  For every 100 females age 18 and over, there were 92.7 males.

The median income for a household in the town was $40,776, and the median income for a family was $50,041. Males had a median income of $31,473 versus $24,978 for females. The per capita income for the town was $18,235.  About 10.4% of families and 13.1% of the population were below the poverty line, including 20.0% of those under age 18 and 20.2% of those age 65 or over.

Site of interest 

 Regional School Unit 22

Notable people 

 Mike Bordick, baseball shortstop (Baltimore and Oakland)
 Joseph E. Brooks, state legislator and journalist
 Alice Osborne Curwen (McKeen), biologist and Episcopal women's leader
 Albert E. Fernald, MOH Recipient
 James Otis Kaler, journalist and children's author
 Frederick Low, US congressman and 9th governor of California
 Jonathan Merrill (1801–1848), Major General, Third Division, Maine Militia
 Michael Thibodeau, Maine state senator
 Daniel White, brigadier general

References

External links

 
 Winterport Memorial Library
 Winterport Water and Sewer Districts

Towns in Waldo County, Maine
Towns in Maine